The Jiangnan Examination Hall (Jiangnan Gongyuan), near the Confucius temple, is located in the southern part of Nanjing, Jiangsu Province, China. It is the largest examination hall for imperial examination in ancient China.

History

Jiangnan Examination Hall (Jiangnan Gongyuan) was first built in the 4th year of the Xiaozong reign (Qiandao era) of the Southern Song (1168). Nanjing was made capital in the Ming dynasty. Jiangnan Examination Hall was used as the examination hall for both the provincial level examination (juren) of Jiangsu Province as well as Anhui Province and metropolitan examination (jinshi). After the capital was moved to Beijing in the Yongle period, the formal capital became Nanjing Had. Jiangnan Examination Hall was heavily expanded with more than 20,000 buildings. In the early Qing dynasty, Nanjing was the capital of Jiangnan province, so the Examination Hall continued to use the name of Jiangnan Examination Hall.

Examination
In the Qing dynasty, the imperial examination included 112 subjects in all; there were, in total, 58 examinees from Jiangnan Province (includes Jiangsu, Anhui, Shanghai today) who passed the provincial imperial examination held in the Jiangnan Examination Hall and then became the Number One Scholar in the final imperial examination. And those 58 examinees of which 49 were from Jiangsu and 9 were from Anhui took up 51.78% of the total number of the Number One Scholar of the national level.

Around the Examination Hall there are two enclosures surrounded with walls full of thorns. They were designed to avoid cheating, and called "Thorns Wall".

Location and size

East from Yao’s Lane, west to Gongyuan West Street, north near Qinhuai River and south to Jiankang Road, the Examination Hall used to cover an area of 300,000 sqm. It is one of the main architectural complexes in the Confucius Temple District. T’ai-tsu also built a government-run brothel by the side of Qinhuai River, which faced the Examination Hall across the river. The brothel was once named as Old Court or Fule Court, which was built for the gifted scholars and the beautiful ladies. The district of Qinhuai River once prospered because of Examination Hall, Fule Court and Confucius Temple. Only a Siheyuan-type building is left now, which was used as a museum about that time. Inside, there is a picture of building models  which shows the magnificence of Examination Hall during its flourishing age.

The Examination Hall was listed among the third batch of Provincial Key Cultural Relics Protection Units in Jiangsu Province in 1982. In 2002, the ancient buildings of Jiangnan Examination Hall were classified into Gongyuan Inscriptions, and it was listed in the provincial units of cultural relics protection under the name of Jiangnan Examination Hall.

Famous people

Famous people in the Ming dynasty and Qing dynasty such as Tang Bohu, Zheng Banqiao, Wu Jingzi, Shi Nai'an, Weng Tonghe, Li Hungchang and "Number One Scholar" Zhang Jiang in the late Qing dynasty all took the imperial examination here.

History museum
A history museum in Jiangnan Examination Hall, is located in the 1st Jinlin Road, Confucius Temple, Nanjing. It is the only professional museum that reflects the content of Chinese imperial civil examination system in China. The museum, open both day and night, is also a place of studying the imperial examination and an institution for collecting cultural relics and historical data about the imperial examination.

Transportation
The building is accessible within walking distance east of Sanshanjie Station of Nanjing Metro.

References

External links

Buildings and structures in Nanjing
Imperial examination
Ming dynasty architecture
Qing dynasty architecture
Museums in Nanjing
Song dynasty architecture